Shahrvand department stores is an Iranian chain based in Tehran. The establishment currently has 35 branches in Tehran. Shahrvand, along with Refah supermarket, and Carrefour-owned Hyperstar Market, create the bulk of the Iranian retail industry.

In 2008, the company teamed with Russian supermarket NEVA-RUS to incorporate the two companies' management techniques.

References

External links
 Official website

Supermarkets of Iran
Retail companies established in 1994
Iranian brands